Nicolò Fazzi (born 2 March 1995) is an Italian footballer who plays as a midfielder or left back for  club Mantova.

Club career
On 25 January 2016 he moved on loan to Crotone.

On 26 January 2021 he signed a 1.5-year contract with Sambenedettese.

On 2 September 2021 he moved to Messina on a two-year deal.

On 26 January 2023, Fazzi signed with Mantova.

International career
Fazzi was a youth international for Italy.

On 12 August 2015, he played a friendly match for Italy U21 against Hungary U21.

References

External links

1995 births
Living people
Sportspeople from the Province of Lucca
Italian footballers
Association football midfielders
Serie A players
Serie B players
Serie C players
ACF Fiorentina players
A.C. Perugia Calcio players
Virtus Entella players
F.C. Crotone players
Atalanta B.C. players
A.C. Cesena players
U.S. Livorno 1915 players
Calcio Padova players
A.S. Sambenedettese players
A.C.R. Messina players
Mantova 1911 players
Italy youth international footballers
Italy under-21 international footballers